Sieglinde Winkler (born 30 March 1966) is a former Austrian alpine skier.

Career
During her career she has achieved 3 results among the top 3 in the World Cup.

World Cup results
Top 3

References

External links
 
 Sieglinde Winkler at Skisport365.com

1966 births
Living people
Austrian female alpine skiers